St. Xavier's School, Hazaribagh is a private Catholic primary and secondary school located in Hazaribagh, Jharkhand (formerly Bihar). The co-educational Christian minority school was founded in 1952 by an Australian Jesuit missionary and is now owned and operated by the Hazaribagh Society of Jesus.

History
The school was established in 1952 by the Australian Jesuit missionary Rev. Fr. John Moore S.J. He was then 32 years old and later went on to win the National Teachers Award.

In its initial years, the school was linked to Loyola School, Jamshedpur. This school was considered the best educational institution of eastern India during 1960s-70s. The first batch of pupils sat for the University of Cambridge Oversea School Certificate examination at Hazaribagh in 1958. The school was all-boys until 1995 when it became co-educational. After 1997 the school affiliated with the CBSE school board and prepared students for both 10th and 12th level examinations.

The built-up area is divided into blocks, Junior School, Middle School, and Senior School. Balmoral field is the football grounds and hosts the annual soccer competition, named in honour of Fr. John Moore, that attracts teams from throughout Jharkhand. On occasion of the school's Diamond Jubilee, the school built a high-class auditorium named Magis costing about 20 crores rupees under the leadership of Dr (Fr) Peter James S.J., a former principal. The school's infrastructure was renewed under the tenure of Fr James with a lot of positive changes.

Alumni 

Hazaribagh Old Xaverians Association (HOXA) is the official alumni organization for the school. It organized a Golden Jubilee celebration in 2008 with alumni gatherings at Hazaribagh, Calcutta, Delhi, Chennai, and Pune.

In January 2012 the school had a Diamond Jubilee (60 years) celebration that led to a new website. The HOXA website includes a class-wise listing of over 7000 alumni who have appeared for the school boards since 1955; thousands of photos in multiple albums, including those related to HOXA reunions; a collection of old and current school magazines and newsletters; audio and video material. Of special note is its video documenting the history of the school. The website attracts over 1650 active users, including current and past teachers, and has a message center that allows all to interact.

Notable alumni
 Raj Kumar Gupta, Indian film Director.
 Bulu Imam, Padma Shree Awardee. 
 A. Gitesh Sarma, I.F.S.
 Tapen Sen, Former Chief Justice Calcutta High Court.
 Ramesh Thakur, Former Assistant-Secretary General of United Nations.
Amitava Mukherjee, Former Senior Expert at United Nations.
Deb Mukherji, I.F.S.
Sanjeeva Sahay, I.A.F.
M S Grewal, I.A.F.
Dr. Ashok Pathak, Member of British Empire (MBE)
P. K. Thakur, I.P.S.
Abir Goswami, Indian Actor.

References

Jesuit primary schools in India
Jesuit secondary schools in India
Christian schools in Jharkhand
Private schools in Jharkhand
Hazaribagh
Educational institutions established in 1952
1952 establishments in Bihar